The Joel McHale Show with Joel McHale is an American comedy streaming television series hosted by Joel McHale that premiered on February 18, 2018, on Netflix. On August 17, 2018, it was announced that Netflix had canceled the series.

Premise
The Joel McHale Show with Joel McHale takes "a sharp, absurdist look at pop culture and news from across the globe, in a fast distillation of everything people are talking about that week. It will feature celebrity guests, comedy sketches, and, of course, video clips from TV, sports, politics, celebrity culture, and every nook and cranny of the internet."

McHale has described how being on Netflix opens the show up to a more global audience allowing the series to cover more international content from outside the United States.

Each episode is developed in the week prior to its premiere so that the content that is included is as topical and relevant as possible. The episode will then feature a mix of footage shot during the previous week and other segments taped further in advance.

Production

Development
On January 19, 2018, it was announced that Netflix had given the production a series order for a first season consisting of thirteen episodes. The series was set to be hosted by Joel McHale who was expected to executive produce alongside Paul Feig, K.P. Anderson, Jessie Henderson, Brad Stevens, and Boyd Vico. Production companies involved with the show were to include Pygmy Wolf Productions, Free Period Productions, Feigco Entertainment, and Lionsgate Television. The show's production staff is said to feature a mix of both new employees and those who previously worked on McHale's prior show, The Soup.

Marketing
On February 8, 2018, Netflix released the first official trailer for the series.

Cancellation
On May 11, 2018, it was reported that Netflix had ordered six additional episodes of the series, which were released simultaneously on July 15, 2018. On August 17, 2018, it was announced that Netflix had canceled the series, reportedly due to low viewership.

Episodes

Reception

The series has been met with a generally positive response from critics since it premiered. On the review aggregation website Rotten Tomatoes, the series holds an 80% approval rating with an average rating of 7 out of 10 based on 5 reviews.

Dennis Perkins of The A.V. Club praised the premiere giving it a B+ and commenting, "In his enjoyable return, the ever-present green screen nimbus surrounding McHale as he roasts the already-overheated dregs of exceedingly expendable TV seems to wink right along with the host’s undeniable charm, making McHale’s sarcastic skewering as amiably fun as ever." Also complimentary was Mark Dolan of Common Sense Media who gave the series three out of five stars and said, "McHale’s innate likability makes him seem more like a bemused everyman as opposed to a smug, mean-spirited jerk (see Daniel Tosh) or an aloof know-it-all (see Dennis Miller). There's a lot more competition in this arena these days then when The Soup premiered, meaning McHale and his writers will need to work harder to bring big laughs if The Joel McHale Show is going to stand out among all the other media-mocking shows currently populating YouTube, podcasts, and late night TV."

In a more negative review, Sonya Saraiya of Variety commented, "The Joel McHale Show with Joel McHale, like The Soup, is such a lazy cocktail party of a show — unerringly brilliant, but usually graceless — that it seems dated in 2018...What distinguishes it is the snarky, superficial brand of postmodern commentary about reality show narratives and foreign soap operas’ recurring tropes, and it's rewarding to see that again. But again and again, McHale reminds you that all the comedy the writing staff has to offer about these clips is barely elevated vulgarity. Almost every clip would be funnier if McHale just said nothing after airing it." Ken Tucker of Yahoo! was similarly  negative saying, "McHale, for all his smirking, remains a smart, likable guy. It's just that he's outgrown this format."

References

External links
 
 

English-language Netflix original programming
2010s American comedy television series
2018 American television series debuts
2018 American television series endings
Television series by Lionsgate Television